Sacer is Latin for "sacred".

Sacer may also refer to:


Latin terms 
Homo sacer, an obscure figure of Roman law who is banned. 
Apparatus sacer, an overview of the different interpretations of the Old and New Testament by ecclesiastical authors.
Mons Sacer, a hill outside Rome, Italy

People with the surname Sacer 
 Gottfried Wilhelm Sacer (1635–1699), German poet, satirist and Protestant hymn writer
 Mario Sačer (born 1990), a Croatian international football forward

Other uses 
 Société Anonyme pour la Construction et l'Entretien des Routes (SACER), a French road construction group

See also 
Sacrum (disambiguation)